Euplectes is a genus of passerine bird in the weaver family, Ploceidae, that contains the bishops and widowbirds. They are all native to Africa south of the Sahara. It is believed that all birds in the genus are probably polygynous.

The genus Euplectes was introduced by the English naturalist William John Swainson in 1829 with the southern red bishop as the type species. The name combines the Ancient Greek eu meaning "fine" or "good" with the New Latin plectes meaning "weaver". When choosing their mates, females within this genus will often choose males with longer tail lengths, even in species with comparatively shorter tail lengths.

Species
The genus contains 18 species.

Aviculture
The yellow-crowned bishop and northern red bishop are popular in aviculture.

References

External links
 
 

 
Bird genera
Taxonomy articles created by Polbot